Events in the year 2023 in the Faroe Islands.

Incumbents 
 Monarch – Margrethe II
 High Commissioner – Lene Moyell Johansen
 Prime Minister – Bárður á Steig Nielsen

Sports 
 2023 Faroe Islands Premier League

Deaths 
 3 January – Páll Vang, 73, politician, minister of agriculture, health, transport and justice (1981–1985).

References 

 
2020s in the Faroe Islands
Years of the 21st century in the Faroe Islands
Faroe Islands
Faroe Islands